The 1974–75 Cypriot First Division was the 36th season of the Cypriot top-level football league.

Overview
It was contested by 14 teams, and AC Omonia won the championship. APOEL did not participate in the Greek championship, even though they were not relegated in the previous season, due to the volatile situation in Cyprus in 1974. They competed in the championship unofficially, but their matches did not count towards the official league table.

League standings

Results

References
Cyprus - List of final tables (RSSSF)

Cypriot First Division seasons
Cypriot First Division, 1974-75
1